Kilgarvan is a Gaelic Athletic Association club in County Kerry, Ireland. They play in the Intermediate Hurling Championship and Division 2 county league. Kilgarvan play football in Division 5 of the county league and in the Kenmare District Board championship and County Novice Championship.

History

The club was founded in 1889. It was one of the five founding clubs of competitive hurling in Kerry. In 1889 Kilgarvan was one of five clubs who competed in the first Kerry Senior Hurling Championship. Kilgarvan won three Kerry Senior Hurling Championship in 1953, 1956 and 1958. In 2007 Kilgarvan became the first Kerry club to win a Munster Hurling club game when they beat Caherline from Limerick in the Quarter-final of the Munster Junior Club Hurling Championship on a scoreline of 2-11 to 2-09. Later they were then beaten by Moyle Rovers 2-17 to 4-05 in the semi-final. In 2008 made more history by becoming the first Kerry club to make it to a Munster Final when they made the Munster Junior Club Hurling Championship Final, however they lost out to Cork side Dripsey on a scoreline of 2-11 to 1-03.

Honours

Hurling

 Kerry Senior Hurling Championship: (3) 1953, 1956, 1958
 Kerry Intermediate Hurling Championship: (11) 1972, 1981, 1982, 1984, 2006, 2007, 2009, 2010, 2018, 2019, 2022
 Munster Junior Club Hurling Championship: Runners-up 2008
 Kerry Junior Hurling Championship: (1) 2005
 Kerry Under-21 hurling championship: (4) 1972, 1987, 1988, 1989, (with Kenamre) 2019 (with Kenmare/Dr. Crokes)
 Kerry Minor Hurling Championship: (3) 1959, 1983, 2010 (with Kenmare)
 Kerry Senior Hurling League Division 2: (5) 2001, 2005, 2006, 2007, 2019
 Kerry Senior Hurling League Division 3: (2) 1994, 2007
 South Kerry Senior Hurling Championship: (11) 1999, 2003, 2006, 2007, 2008, 2009, 2010, 2014, 2016, 2018, 2019
 South Kerry Senior Hurling League: (6) 2002, 2003, 2005, 2006, 2007, 2014
 South Kerry Junior Hurling Championship: (4) 2003, 2005, 2006, 2012
 South Kerry Junior Hurling League: (2) 2006, 2007

Football
 Munster Junior B Football Championship: (2) 2018, 2023
 Kerry Novice Football Championship: (2) 2018, 2022
 Kerry Novice Shield 2: (2) 1999, 2001
 Kenmare District Board Senior Championship (Finnegan Cup): (1) 1961
 Kenmare District Board Intermediate Championship (Murphy Cup): (1) 2003
Kenmare District Board Junior Championship (Purcell Cup): (2) 1991, 1998
Kenmare District Board Senior League (Spillane Cup): (1) 1983

County Championship Winning Captions

1953: Ritchie Purcell 
1956: Paudie Healy
1958: Denis Hegarty

References

External links
Official Kilgarvan GAA Club website

Gaelic games clubs in County Kerry
Gaelic football clubs in County Kerry
Hurling clubs in County Kerry